Contemporary Color is a 2016 documentary film directed by Turner Ross and Bill Ross IV. The film was produced as a collaboration between David Byrne, Michael Gottwald, Dan Janvey and Josh Penn.

References

External links
 

2016 films
American documentary films
Films shot in Pennsylvania
Films shot in New Jersey
2010s English-language films
2010s American films